The Taipei Railway Workshop was the largest railway workshop of Taiwan Railways Administration. For decades it manufactured and maintained thousands of railway vehicles. The workshop was established in 1935 to replace the original workshop, which had become inadequate. It was the largest railway workshop ever built in Taiwan. The Governor-General of Taiwan recognized its establishment as a celebration of the Empire of Japan's rule of Taiwan for 40 years.

The 16.82-hectare site on Civic Boulevard was the largest and oldest of its kind on the island. It closed in 2012. It was constructed in 1930 and features distinctive structures such as a 168-meter-long train assembly shed. The operation was transferred to TRA Fugang Vehicle Depot. The workshop was recognized as an "official national historic site" in 2015. The government of Taiwan says it is planning to transform the facility into a railway museum.

In popular culture 
The Taipei Railway Workshop was featured in the 2013 Jay Chou film The Rooftop and in the 2014 Luc Besson film Lucy.

Gallery

Transportation 
The Taipei Railway Workshop is accessible within walking distance northeast from Sun Yat-sen Memorial Hall Station of the Taipei Metro.

References 

1935 establishments in Taiwan
Executive Yuan
Railway workshops in Taiwan
Defunct railway workshops
3 ft 6 in gauge railways in Taiwan
National monuments of Taiwan